Rakkeby is a small village on the island of Mors, northern Jutland, Denmark with 228 inhabitants (2011).  Rakkeby is in the western part of the island, about 5 km east-northeast of Karby.

References

Villages in Denmark
Morsø Municipality